The Hutchens was an American country music trio from Sandy Ridge, North Carolina composed of brothers Barry, Bill and Bryan Hutchens. They were signed to Atlantic Records and released their debut album, Knock, Knock, in 1995. Stephen Thomas Erlewine of Allmusic gave the album three stars out of five, writing that it "showcases their laid-back country-rock to a fine effect."

Its lead single, the title track, peaked at number 56 on the Billboard Hot Country Singles & Tracks chart. It received a favorable review from Deborah Evans Price of Billboard, who said that it features "high-energy production, lots of personality in the vocal delivery, and [a] catchy chorus."

Knock, Knock

Track listing
"Knock, Knock" (Jeff Stevens, Jerry Salley) – 2:09
"She Just Wants to Dance" (Bob Regan, Calvin Davidson) – 3:14
"Fear of a Broken Heart" (Billy Spencer, Paul Jefferson, Steve McClintock) – 2:51
"Your One And Only" (Even Stevens, Hillary Kanter) – 2:44
"Billy's Dream" (Jess Brown) – 3:56
"Wait a Minute" (Herb Pedersen) – 3:07
"Even Fools Get Lucky Sometimes" (Curtis Wright, Robert Ellis Orrall) – 3:38
"The Train Don't Stop Here Anymore" (John Scott Sherrill, Michael Henderson) – 2:31
"I'd Know" (Victoria Shaw, Salley) – 3:11
"I Like Simple Things" (Keith Stegall, Roger Murrah, J. Stevens) – 2:39

Chart Performance

Music videos

References

Country music groups from North Carolina
Atlantic Records artists
Sibling musical trios